Ziaul may refer to:

Ziaul Ahsan SBP, 2 Star rank Bangladesh Army officer
A. K. M. Ziaul Ameen, Member of the 3rd National Assembly of Pakistan
Ziaul Faruq Apurba (born 1983), Bangladeshi model and actor
Sayed Ziaul Haq (1928–1988), Sufi saint of the Maizbhanderi Sufi order
Syed Mohammad Ziaul Haque, Bangladesh Army officer and a fugitive
Ziaul Haque (died 1998), scholar of economic history and Islamic studies
Ziaul Islam (1952–2014), Bangladeshi ICC Trophy cricketer
Ziaul Haque Mollah, Bangladesh Nationalist Party politician and former MP
Md. Ziaul Haque Mridha, Jatiya Party politician and the former MP
Ziaul Mustafa Razvi Qadri, Islamic scholar
Ziaul Roshan (born 1989), Bangladeshi film actor and model,
Ziaul Hasan Siddiqui, the chairman of Sonali Bank Limited
Ziaul Haque Zia (1953–2016), Bangladesh Nationalist Party politician